Cuchifritos or cochifritos refers to various fried foods prepared principally of pork in Spanish and Puerto Rican cuisine. In Spain, cuchifritos are a typical dish from Segovia in Castile. The dish consists of pork meat fried in olive oil and garlic and served hot. In Puerto Rico they include a variety of dishes including morcilla (blood sausage), papas rellenas (fried potato balls stuffed with meat), and chicharron (fried pork skin), and other parts of the pig prepared in different ways. Some cuchifritos dishes are prepared using plantain as a primary ingredient. Cuchifritos vendors also typically serve juices and drinks such as passionfruit, pineapple, and coconut juice, as well as ajonjolí, a drink made from sesame seeds.

Origin 
The term used to refer to small, fried parts of a pig.

It is incorrectly thought that it derives its name from the word cuchí, short for cochino or pig and frito, which describes something that is fried.

The etymology of the word comes from the participle of verbs cocer -to cook or boil- (latín coctum > cocho, from which derives the element cochi-) y freír -to fry-(-frito).

Cuchifritos may also refer to restaurants that serve this type of food.

In New York 
In New York, vendors advertising cuchifritos are particularly notable because they tend to make use of colorful external lighting and big, flashy signs that quickly catch the eyes of passersby. These establishments dot Puerto Rican and Dominican areas of New York City, particularly Spanish Harlem, Bushwick, Hamilton Heights, Washington Heights, South Bronx, Brooklyn, and other primarily Puerto Rican and Dominican neighborhoods.

Puerto Rican dishes 
Cuchifrito vendors also sell rice with stewed beans, arroz junto, and arroz con gandules. Originally these fried dish would have been fried in lard. Today they use frying oil because it is cheaper and  very available. Some Dominican dishes have been adopted notably morir soñando and mangú. Jamaican patty and Cuban masitas de puerco (fried pork shoulder) are popular in cuchifritos as well. 

Fried dishes served in a cuchifrito:

Aítos – Bacalaítos with crab or shrimp added.
Alcapurria – Starchy dough from yautía mixed with green banana, lard, annatto, garlic, and a small of amount of squash and potato. Stuffed with meat, shaped more or less as a cone on both ends and deep-fried. 
Alcapurria de malanga – Taro replacing green banana.
Alcapurria de panapén – Breadfruit replacing green banana.
Alcapurria de plátano – Green plantain replacing green banana. 
Alcapurria de yuca – Cassava replacing green banana.
Almojábana – A round fitter made of rice flour, plantain flour, tapioca, or breadfruit flour, milk, eggs, sugar, baking powder, baking soda, stuffed with cheese and fried. 
Arañitas – Arañitas translate to "spiders". These small fritters are called spiders, due to the wide shredding of plantains. The green plantains are shredded and seasoned with garlic, salt, peppers, formed into flat small fritters and fried. Many other recipes exist, such as adding sweet plantains, eggs, onion, fresh herbs, cheese and shredded meat. They are served with fry sauce.
Arepa de coco – Bread made from flour or cornmeal, coconut milk, butter, baking powder, eggs (optional), few tablespoons of milk (optional), sugar, and salt. They are fried, baked or cooked on a flattop. They are cut open and stuffed with seafood but have the option of meat, vegetables and cheese. 
Bacalaíto – Deep fried pancake-like batter containing salted codfish, flour, milk, sofrito and spices.
Canoas de plátano – Sweet plantains are cut down the middle fried or baked and stuffed with savory ground meat and topped with shredded cheese. 
Chicharrón – Pork cracklings. 
Chicharrón de pollo – Fried bite size chicken chunks marinated and coated in a seasoned egg batter of flour and cornstarch. 
Empanadilla and Pastelillo – Empanadas.
Mofongo – This dish might be Puerto Ricos most famous dish. The plantains are typically fried before mashing with broth, spices, garlic, olive oil, and chicarrón but the plantains can also be boiled, roasted or baked. It is severd in numerous ways.
Morcilla – Blood sausage.
Oreja – Fried pig ears. 
Pastelillo or Pastelillo de yuca – Empanada dough made with tapioca, annatto, lard, milk and egg yolks. Filled with choose of meat or cheese. 
Pionono – Slices of ripe plantain stuck together with toothpicks and filled with the seasoned ground beef or seafood and cheese. They are dipped in a batter and fried.
Plátanos maduro – Slices of sweet plantains deep-fried.
Pollo frito – Breaded fried chicken thighs or legs. 
Relleno de maduros – Sweet planatin version of relleno de papa.
Rellenos de papa – Cooked potatoes mashed with eggs, milk, annatto, flour or cornstarch, stuffed with picadillo, meat, seafood, vegetables, or cheese rolled in cornmeal or breadcrumbs, then deep fried.
Rellenos de panapén – Breadfruit version of rellenos de papa.
Rellenos de yuca – Cassave version of rellenos de papa.
Sorullos – Sweet cornmeal base fitter similar to hushpuppy filled with cheese.
Tostones – Double fried green plantains served with meals or as a snack with mojo sauce, hot sauce or fry sauce.
Tostones de panapén – Same as plantain tostone but with unripe breadfruit.

In media 

New World cuchifritos and cuchifrito establishments have appeared regularly in the Bronx Flavor television series hosted by Baron Ambrosia. Episodes such as "Cuchifritos of Love" document the history of the food and its distinct role in Nuyorican cuisine and identity.

See also 

 Cuisine of Puerto Rico
 Cuisine of New York City
 Finger food

References

External links 
 Traditional recipe of cuchifrito. Take a taste of Extremadura, Spain

Puerto Rican cuisine
Latin American cuisine
Spanish cuisine